In quantified modal logic, the Buridan formula and the converse Buridan formula (more accurately, schemata rather than formulas) (i) syntactically state principles of interchange between quantifiers and modalities; (ii) semantically state a relation between domains of possible worlds. The formulas are named in honor of the medieval philosopher Jean Buridan by analogy with the Barcan formula and the converse Barcan formula introduced as axioms by Ruth Barcan Marcus.

The Buridan formula 
The Buridan formula is:

.
In English, the schema reads: If possibly everything is F, then everything is possibly F. It is equivalent in a classical modal logic (but not necessarily in other formulations of modal logic) to

.

The converse Buridan formula 
The converse Buridan formula is:

.

Buridan's logic 

In medieval scholasticism, nominalists held that universals exist only subsequent to particular things or pragmatic circumstances, while realists followed Plato in asserting that universals exist independently of, and superior to, particular things.

References

 
 
  See page 190.

Modal logic